Thorens may refer to:

 Thorens, Swiss manufacturer of high-end audio equipment
 Thorens-Glières, former commune in Haute-Savoie, France
 Adèle Thorens Goumaz (born 1971), Swiss politician
 Château de Thorens, castle in Thorens-Glières, Haute-Savoie, France
 Pointe de Thorens, mountain of Savoie, France
 Val Thorens, ski resort in Savoie, French Alps